The Social Alliance Party, or PAS, was a political party in Mexico.

PAS Presidents
(1999 - 2003): José Antonio Calderón Cardoso

PAS presidential candidates
(2000): Cuauhtémoc Cárdenas Solórzano (alliance with PRD, PT, C and PSN to form Alliance for Mexico coalition)

Defunct political parties in Mexico